Xerophyta is a plant genus in the family Velloziaceae named in 1789. It is native to Africa, Madagascar, and the Arabian Peninsula.

Some species in this genus are poikilochlorophyllous plants. This means that during dry climatic conditions, they lose chlorophyll and cease photosynthesis and transpiration. Thus they are extremely tolerant of desiccation . Hence the name Xerophyta, from Ancient Greek ξηρός (xeros, "dry") and  φυτά (phutá), plural of φυτόν (phutón, “plant”).

 Species

 formerly included
moved to other genera: Barbaceniopsis Nanuza Vellozia

See also 
 Resurrection plant

References

External links 

Velloziaceae
Pandanales genera